Kerem Shalom (lit. Vineyard of Peace) is a kibbutz in southern Israel. Located on the Gaza Strip-Israel-Egypt border, it falls under the jurisdiction of Eshkol Regional Council.

History
The kibbutz was founded in 1967 adjacent to the triborder area by members of Hashomer Hatzair. Its name includes the word shalom since the members believed that the location would play a role in establishing peace and ending the Arab–Israeli conflict.

Haaretz described it as "a small community with a communal-secular way of life, which marks holidays and holds culture evenings together and observes total mutual responsibility - in education, culture, health and its economy." According to Ilan Regev, the community manager, "the kibbutz, which was founded in 1967, fell apart in 1995, after members left, but in 2001, it was reestablished." In 2011, the kibbutz had 35 members and candidates (families and individuals), about 30 children and eight members of a youth movement on a year of service prior to serving in the IDF. Eight families joined the kibbutz after Operation Cast Lead. The kibbutz started a campaign in 2011 to attract new residents, called "Zionism 2011". Proximity to the Gaza Strip, being subjected to Palestinian mortar attacks and its association with the abduction of Gilad Shalit, which happened close by, has resulted in the kibbutz struggling to increase its membership according to Regev. He described the kibbutz as "unique in the country in an area that in effect determines the borders of the state, the way it was at the start of Zionism, with an attempt to shape a just and egalitarian society." The Israeli government required the kibbutz to populate at least 40% of the 100 allocated residential slots within a specified time which, according to Regev, required 80 new members and candidates. The state can reduce the "means of production—land, water and the like" if its requirements are not met.

In March 2006, the Avian influenza virus was identified in turkey coops in Kerem Shalom.

In 2008, the kibbutz was bombarded by mortar shells in an attack described as the worst since the Israeli disengagement from Gaza.  Although a mortar shell hit the electricity infrastructure, several families insisted on celebrating the Passover seder at the kibbutz dining hall.

References

External links
Kerem Shalom Negev Information Centre

Kibbutzim
Kibbutz Movement
Eshkol Regional Council
Geography of the Gaza Strip
Populated places established in 1967
1995 disestablishments in Israel
Populated places disestablished in 1995
1967 establishments in Israel
2001 establishments in Israel
Populated places established in 2001
Israel–Gaza Strip border
Gaza envelope
Populated places in Southern District (Israel)